Chlorosulfonyl isocyanate is the chemical compound ClSO2NCO, known as CSI.  This compound is a versatile reagent in organic synthesis.

Preparation, structure, handling
CSI is prepared by treating cyanogen chloride with sulfur trioxide, the product being distilled directly from the reaction mixture.
SO3  +  ClCN  →  ClSO2NCO
In this transformation, both the carbon and the nitrogen termini of CN are functionalized.

The structure of CSI is represented as ClS(O)2-N=C=O.  It consists of two electron-withdrawing components, the chlorosulfonyl group (SO2Cl) and the isocyanate group (-N=C=O).  Because of its resulting electrophilicity, the use of CSI in chemical synthesis requires relatively inert solvents such as chlorocarbons, acetonitrile, and ethers.

Uses
The molecule has two electrophilic sites, the carbon and the S(VI) center.

CSI has been employed for the preparation of β-lactams, some of which are medicinally important. Thus, alkenes undergo a [2+2]-cycloaddition to give the sulfonamide.  The SO2Cl group can be removed simply by hydrolysis, leaving the secondary amide.
Other reactions of CSI:
Cycloaddition to alkynes to give 1,2,3-oxathiazine-2,2-dioxide-6-chlorides.
Conversion of primary alcohols to carbamates.
Conversion of carboxylic acids and the acid chlorides into nitriles.
Preparation of N,N-disubstituted sulfamides, R2NSO2NH2
Preparation of Burgess reagent

Safety considerations
CSI is toxic, corrosive and reacts violently with water. Like hydrofluoric acid, it cannot be stored in glassware, requiring instead polyethylene bottles.

References

Inorganic carbon compounds
Reagents for organic chemistry
Isocyanates
Sulfuryl compounds